The  is a major commuter line operated by the private railway operator Tokyu Corporation and connecting south-western suburbs of Tokyo and neighbouring Kanagawa Prefecture, with its western terminus of , to a major railway junction of western downtown Tokyo, . At Shibuya, nearly all the trains continue on the Tokyo Metro Hanzomon Line.

The line's color on maps and station guides is green, and stations carry the prefix "DT" followed by a number.

History

Prewar predecessors
On March 6, 1907, the  opened the first section of an interurban line between Shibuya and what is now , using  gauge. The branch from Sangen-Jaya Station opened on January 18, 1925.

Tama Den-En-Toshi Plan
In 1953, Tokyu Group president Keita Gotō unveiled a "new town" planning scheme called the South-Western Area Development Plan. He envisioned new railway line and freeway and large, clean houses for commuters working in Tokyo. The railway line would become the Tama Den-En-Toshi Line and the expressway the Tōmei Expressway. The parts of the new line completely overlaps the Tamagawa Line and the project is known as the Shin-Tamagawa Line or "New Tamagawa Line" which runs in an underground alignment under the old interurban line. The Tamagawa Line was closed in 1969 in anticipation for the opening of the Shin-Tamagawa Line, with the remaining branch line of the Tamagawa Electric Railway split off into the present Tokyu Setagaya Line. The underground Shin-Tamagawa Line opened a few years later in 1977, completely replacing the closed interurban line. Upon opening it was treated as a separate line from the Ōimachi Line connecting to said line at Futako-Tamagawa.

Development of the line
Trains through servicing into the Tokyo Metro Hanzōmon Line was extended beyond  into Isesaki Line and Nikkō Line of Tobu Railway on March 19, 2003.

Tokyu has expanded the line to four tracks from Futako-Tamagawa to Mizonokuchi; most trains of the Ōimachi line run through this section to Mizonokuchi, with some local trains making the intermediate stops.

Future developments
Platform edge doors are scheduled to be installed at all stations on the line by 2020.

Operation
Nearly all trains on the Den-en-toshi Line are operated through to/from the Tokyo Metro Hanzomon Line using Tokyu, Tokyo Metro, and Tobu Railway 10-car EMUs. Around half of them continue beyond , the terminus of the Hanzomon Line, to the Tobu Skytree Line (Kita-Koshigaya Station, Kita-Kasukabe Station and Tōbu-Dōbutsu-Kōen Station), Tobu Isesaki Line (Kuki Station), and Tōbu Nikkō Line (Minami-Kurihashi Station). At rush hour, an inbound train arrives as frequently as every 2 minutes 10 seconds.

Service types
The following three types of service are operated on the line.
  (L)
Stops at all stations. Eight services per hour in each direction during the daytime. Two of eight are not through service to the Hanzōmon Line.
  (SE)
In the morning rush hour, all limited-stop services are semi-express.
In the daytime, two services are operated per hour in each direction and connect to a local train at Shibuya (outbound only), Saginuma and Nagatsuta (inbound only).
  (Ex)
Not operated in morning rush hour.  In the daytime, six services are operated per hour in each direction and two of six is through to the Ōimachi Line. Most express connect to a local train at Sangen-jaya (inbound only), Futako-tamagawa (outbound and through service to the Ōimachi Line), Saginuma and Nagatsuta.

Through trains to Ōimachi Line
These formations are 7-car sets, unlike the 10-car trains normally used on the line.

Stations

Footnotes

Rolling stock

Current
 Tokyu 2020 series
 Tokyu 5000 series
 Tokyo Metro 8000 series
 Tokyo Metro 08 series
 Tokyo Metro 18000 series
 Tobu 50000 series
 Tobu 50050 series

Former
 Tobu 30000 series
 Tokyu 2000 series
 Tokyu 8500 series (1975–2023)
 Tokyu 8590 series

References

External links

 Tokyu Corporation website 

Denentoshi Line
Railway lines in Tokyo
Railway lines in Kanagawa Prefecture
1067 mm gauge railways in Japan